Candidate of Psychology, abbreviated cand.psych. in Denmark and cand.psychol. in Norway, is a higher-level professional degree currently awarded in Denmark and Norway in the field of clinical psychology. In scope and length it is equal to a degree somewhere between a masters and a Psy.D.-degree in clinical psychology.

It was introduced at the University of Copenhagen in 1944 and at the University of Oslo in 1948 based on the Danish degree. In Denmark the degree requires five years of studies, while in Norway it required five years of academic studies and a one-year internship as part of the studies. As part of the Bologna Process the degree in Denmark consists of a three-year bachelor's degree in psychology followed by a two-year master's degree in clinical psychology that gives the right to use the title cand.psych.

In Denmark the degree is awarded by the University of Copenhagen, Aarhus University, University of Southern Denmark and Aalborg University. In Norway the degree is awarded by the University of Oslo, the Norwegian University of Science and Technology, the University of Bergen, and the University of Tromsø.  

Although completion of the degree qualifies the holder to apply for a license as a clinical psychologist, it does not in itself authorize the holder to practice clinical psychology. In Norway, after the final exam those with a cand.psychol. may apply for and will normally be granted the authorization to practice clinical psychology. In Denmark two years of supervised practice is required before one is granted a full authorization.

References

Master's degrees
Academic degrees of Denmark
Academic degrees of Norway